Hanna Maria Jaltner (born 16 June 1976) is a former breaststroke swimmer from Sweden. She competed for her native country at the 1996 Summer Olympics in Atlanta, Georgia, in the Women's 100 m breaststroke (16th place) and the Women's 4x100 m medley relay (10th place). She was affiliated with the University of California in Berkeley, California.

Clubs
Växjö SS

References

1976 births
Living people
Swimmers from Stockholm
Olympic swimmers of Sweden
Swimmers at the 1996 Summer Olympics
University of California, Berkeley alumni
Swedish female breaststroke swimmers
20th-century Swedish women